Lucy Tulugarjuk (born February 28, 1975) is an Inuit actress, throat singer, and director. She is executive director for the Nunavut Independent Television Network.

Biography
Tulugarjuk is from Igloolik, Nunavut.

Career
Tulugarjuk is known for starring in the 2001 film Atanarjuat: The Fast Runner, for which she won the award for Best Actress at the American Indian Film Festival. In 2015, she acted in the film Maliglutit. In 2017 she directed her first feature-length film Tia and Piujiq. The film featured Marie-Hélèn Cousineau as producer and Tulugarjuk's daughter in the lead role as Piujuk.

She performs as a throat singer, but in 2014 declined to perform for Nunavut MP Leona Aglukkaq in protest of the government's seismic testing. That year, she wore seal skin at the Gone Wild show in Fort Smith, Northwest Territories to support Inuit culture. In 2016, she also called for the resignation of Aglukkaq's successor as MP, Hunter Tootoo.

She is executive director for Nunavut Independent Television Network, a service of Isuma based in Igloolik. In 2021, Isuma launched Uvagut TV, a 24/7 online channel devoted to Inuktitut language programming, for which Tulugarjuk is managing director. Tulugarjuk reported that she sees the channel as 'a tool for preserving and revitalizing the  language and culture'.

Filmography

As actress

As filmmaker

Awards and nominations

References

External links

Lucy Tulugarjuk at Isuma TV

1975 births
Actresses from Nunavut
Canadian Inuit women
Living people
Musicians from Nunavut
People from Igloolik
Inuit throat singing
Inuit from the Northwest Territories
Inuit from Nunavut
Canadian film actresses
Canadian television executives